Budişteni may refer to several villages in Romania:

 Budişteni, a village in Leordeni Commune, Argeș County
 Budişteni, a village in Costești, Buzău